Yefimovskaya is a rural locality (a village) in Tarnogskoye Rural Settlement, Tarnogsky District, Vologda Oblast, Russia. The population was 66 as of 2002.

Geography 
Yefimovskaya is located 27 km northeast of Tarnogsky Gorodok (the district's administrative centre) by road. Verkhnekokshengsky Pogost is the nearest rural locality.

References 

Rural localities in Tarnogsky District